The Samyang Optics / Rokinon AF 14mm F2.8 FE is an ultra wide-angle full-frame prime lens for Sony E-mount. It was announced by Samyang Optics on August 17, 2016 

The lens is currently the widest-angle autofocus prime lens featuring a large maximum aperture of f/2.8 and coverage of Sony's full-frame sensor cameras. Though designed for Sony's full frame E-mount cameras, the lens can be used on Sony's APS-C E-mount camera bodies, with an equivalent full-frame field-of-view of 21mm.

See also
 List of third-party E-mount lenses
Samyang autofocus lenses

References

Camera lenses introduced in 2016
14